The sedimentary basins of Britain and Ireland are numerous, occurring beneath both the land surface of these islands and the surrounding seas. Sedimentary basins (not to be confused with drainage basins) have operated in this region over much of geological time from  the Precambrian to the present day, typically accepting sediment from neighbouring areas where erosion is taking place, over timescales variously from millions to hundreds of millions of years. They may be referred to simply as basins or else as troughs, grabens or half-grabens, according to their mode of formation and morphology.

Key to table 

Column 1 indicates the name of the basin. Some variant names are recorded between sources. Sub-basins are noted.
Column 2 indicates the area (country/sea) in which the basin occurs. Some extend across more than one. Sea areas include the Atlantic Ocean, North Sea, English Channel, Sea of the Hebrides, Irish Sea, Celtic Sea, Bristol Channel, The Minch
Column 3 indicates the period(s) or epoch(s) during which it was active as a sediment sink. May not be exhaustive.
Column 4 provides any additional notes
Column 5 indicates a selection of publications in which references to the basin may be found. See references section for full details of publication.

See also
 Geological structure of Great Britain
 Gravity anomalies of Britain and Ireland

References
BGS Tm = BGS 1996 Tectonic map of Britain, Ireland and adjacent areas, Pharaoh T.C., Morris J.H., Long C.B., Ryan P.D. (compilers) 1:1,500,000 (Keyworth, Nottingham, British Geological Survey) 
Txxx = Trewin, N.H. (editor) 2002 The Geology of Scotland 4th edition The Geological Society, London  (where xxx = page number)
B&Rxxx = Brenchley, P.J & Rawson, P.F. (editors) 2006 The Geology of England and Wales 2nd edition, The Geological Society, London  (where xxx = page number)

Depressions (geology)
Structural geology
Sedimentary basins of Europe
Geology of the United Kingdom
Geology of the Republic of Ireland